USS Tenino (ATF-115) was an Abnaki-class fleet ocean tug. She earned one battle star for service in World War II.

Service history
Served in the Okinawa Gunto operation from April through June 1945 and the Assault and occupation of Okinawa Gunto, 11 May 1945. Transferred to Beaumont Reserve Fleet, 1961. Sunk as a missile test target 1986.

References

 

Abnaki-class tugs
1944 ships
Ships built in Alameda, California